Since Bangladesh's independence in 1971, the transportation sector has grown rapidly and transportation medium on land and rivers have begun to develop. Air travel came into existence later. Though Bangladesh has greatly evolved in the transportation sector, it still has many flaws which hamper the development of other economic and social sectors. Transportation has evolved in mostly land vehicles but it still needs improvement in safety standards, which endangers the life of civilians.  
Road safety – Ministry of Road Transport and Bridges
Rail transport – Ministry of Railways
Civil aviation – Ministry of Civil Aviation and Tourism
Maritime transport – Ministry of Shipping

Road 

 
With continued economic development, Dhaka (Bangladesh's capital) is beginning to experience severe traffic congestion. This is impacting the quality of life for inhabitants of the metropolitan area, the nation's largest. Many government and public-transport agencies drafted policies, undertook projects and implemented programmes to solve the problem. The Dhaka Integrated Transport Studies, conducted by the Ministry of Planning in 1991–1994, found that the uncoordinated activities of Dhaka City Corporation (DCC), Rajdhani Unnayan Kartripakkha (RAJUK) and the Bangladesh Road Transport Authority (BRTA) did not alleviate the problem and there was no one organisation responsible for improving the city's transport and traffic problems.

With financial assistance from the World Bank, the government of Bangladesh created the Dhaka Transport Coordination Board in 1998. An urban transport plan was commissioned with the US consultant Louis Berger Group and Bangladesh Consultant Ltd (BCL). The plan looked at 15 key policy issues, including safety, pedestrian preferences, public transport, non-motorised transport, travel demand management and mass transit systems, and almost 70 policy recommendations were made. Ten comprehensive transport strategies were evaluated, using a baseline of no Bus rapid transit (BRT) or metro service, and a number of alternatives were explored. The adopted plan included roads, a three-line Mass Rapid Transit (MRT) and three-line BRT. It included provisions for 54 new roads in and around the city, three-part elevated expressways and a circular waterway programme.

Prime Minister Sheikh Hasina inaugurated Bangladesh's highest road, Thanchi-Alikadam Road in Bandarban District, in a 2015 video conference from Dhaka.

Traffic congestion 
With more than  vehicles in Bangladesh and the country's population and infrastructure, traffic congestion wastes fuel and time and makes travel difficult. It also makes existing public transport inefficient, adding unsafe levels of noise and air pollution. Noise and pollution are stressful, and lead to medical conditions such as cardiovascular disease and hypertension.

Traffic congestion varies during the day, necessitating planning and longer trips; this impacts productivity, cutting across social and economic status. Although walking is a major travel mode of the low-income majority, pedestrian needs are ignored in transport planning. As a result of traffic congestion, more people walk and bicycle; however, both may be dangerous. Almost 80 percent of traffic fatalities in Dhaka are pedestrians struck by a fuel-based vehicle. Although private cars are four percent of total vehicles, they occupy about 70 percent of road space. Public transport must be stressed in any future policy. The change to compressed natural gas (CNG) cars saved over 4,000 premature deaths in 2009, but their low cost has increased the number of cars on the roads (although CNG price increases may have tempered the increase) and decreased the amount of natural gas available for other purposes.

Road safety 
Passenger's and pedestrian's safety in the roads is currently a burning issue in Bangladesh. Death counts in the highways are rising every day in an alarming rate. Although the government is undertaking a number of significant steps addressing the issue, situations in the highways don't seem to get much positive change too soon. Public unrest and riots demanding safe roads tend to occur in quite an unpredictable manner as both the authority and the highway section of the police prove to fail in bringing discipline in the road transportation system. Alternative ways of mass transit system in public basis have been taken and lots are still undergoing, but the source of all problems is said to lie with untrained drivers and inadequate maintenance of the highways.

Rail 

Rail transport in Bangladesh comprises railways operated by Bangladesh Railway, and the Dhaka Metro Rail operated by the Dhaka Mass Transit Company Limited.

Rail is as an important method of mass transport in Bangladesh, and many districts are connected by rail. Bangladesh Railway was primarily inherited from the British Assam Bengal Railway system after the partition of India in 1947. Its headquarters is in the southern port city of Chittagong, the south-eastern terminus of the Assam Bengal Railway. After independence from West Pakistan in 1971, only short length of new tracks were laid.

Of that,  are  broad gauge tracks (mainly in the western region) and the remaining  are metre-gauge tracks (mainly in the central and eastern regions). The gauge difference is being addressed by adding third rails to major broad- and metre-gauge routes, making them dual gauge. A road-rail bridge over the Jamuna River opened in 1998 to connect the east and west rail networks.

The border between India and Bangladesh cuts across railway lines, forcing them into the adjacent country for short distances and complicating border controls such as passport validation. After 43 years, the Maitree Express renewed rail transport between Bangladesh and India in 2008; nine years later, Bandhan Express. a second rail service from Kolkata to Khulna began.

Air 

Biman Bangladesh Airlines, the country's national airline, began operation in 1972. Other Bangladeshi-registered passenger airlines are Novoair, Regent Airways and United Airways. All four of the carriers have a hub at Shahjalal International Airport, and operate domestic and international flights.

Bangladesh has three international airports: Shahjalal International Airport in Dhaka, Shah Amanat International Airport in Chittagong and Osmani International Airport in Sylhet. All three have direct connections to Mideast destinations, and Shahjalal also serves the wider Asian region and Europe. In addition to the international airports, there are five domestic airports: in Barisal, Cox's Bazar, Jessore, Rajshahi and Saidpur. Nearly all service at these airports is to (or from) Dhaka.

Water 

Because of Bangladesh's many rivers, ferries are an important means of transport. The ferries are often overloaded and continue to operate in poor weather; many people die each year in ferry and launch accidents. The launch Pinak 6 sank in the Padma River with more than 200 passengers aboard near Munshiganj's Louhajang Upazila in 2016.

Bangladesh's ports and harbours are Chittagong, on the east coast; river ports at Dhaka, Narayanganj, Baghabari and Ashuganj, and seaports at Mongla and Payra. A deepwater port has been proposed on Sonadia Island. The country's 
merchant navy consisted of 306 ships, including 28 bulk carriers, four container ships, 75 cargo ships and 110 oil tankers, in 2017.

Pipelines 

References

Notes

External links 

 Total Communication Of Bangladesh
 https://titastransportbd.com